Huby-Saint-Leu is a commune in the Pas-de-Calais department in the Hauts-de-France region of France.

Geography
Huby-Saint-Leu lies to the north of Hesdin, and is not much more than a suburb of that town.
The D928 road to Saint-Omer passes nearby.

History
A military base during World War One. There is a British cemetery at Huby-St-Leu

Population

See also
Communes of the Pas-de-Calais department

References

External links

The British Cemetery at Huby

Hubysaintleu
Artois